Taio Asahisa (born 16 January 1998) is a Japanese kickboxer, currently fighting in the lightweight division of K-1, where he is the former lightweight champion. 

As of May 2021, he was the #1 ranked Super Bantamweight in the world according to Combat Press.

Kickboxing career

Super Bantamweight career
Asahisa was schooled in Asahisa karate by his father, who had developed the style, and participated in numerous amateur karate and kickboxing competitions from a young age. He was most notably eliminated from the All Japan Junior Kick competitions two years in a row by Tenshin Nasukawa, and by Ren Hiramoto in the first round of the 2014 K-1 Koshien tournament.

Asahisa made his professional debut on September 21, 2014, at the age of 16, being scheduled to fight Masachika Morimoto in the quarterfinals of the 2014 J-Fight Next Generation Cup. He beat Morimoto by unanimous decision, winning the fight by 20-18 on two of the three judges scorecards. Advancing to the semifinals, Asahisa faced Takaya Ogura. He managed to knock Ogura down late in the first round, and won by technical knockout nine seconds into the second round. Asahisa fought the WPMF Japan Bantamweight champion Teru in the finals and won the fight by unanimous decision. Aside from winning the tournament title, Asahisa was awarded ¥300,000 in prize money.

Asahisa was scheduled to make his K-1 debut against Namito Izawa at Krush 49. The fight was ruled as a draw, after the first three rounds of the bout, and went into an extra extension round. Izawa won the extra round of all three of the judges scorecards. Asahisa was scheduled to make his second promotional appearance against Chikara Iwao at Krush 54. He achieved his first win with the promotion by majority decision. Asahisa lost his next fight against Keisuke Ishida by unanimous decision, with Ishida clearly winning two of the three rounds of the bout.

Asahisa moved away from K-1 for his next two fights. He would win a decision against Chibita at Pound for Pound vol.5 and lose a decision against Kim Sang-Jae at MAX FC. He returned to K-1 to face Haruma Saikyo at K-1 World GP 2016 -65kg World Tournament. Saikyo was the more dominant party in the first round, while Asahisa was more successful in pressuring Saikyo in the second and third round. Saikyo won the fight by majority decision, with two of the judges awarding him a 30-29 scorecard.

Super Featherweight career

First Krush Super Featherweight tournament
For his next fight, Asahisa moved up from Krush's super bantamweight (55kg) category up to super featherweight (60kg), having amassed a 5-4 record at 55kg. He was scheduled to fight Fumiya Osawa at Krush 70. Asahsisa won the closely contested fight by majority decision.

Following his successful divisional debut, Asahisa took part in the Krush Super Featherweight tournament. He was scheduled to face Sano Tenma at Krush 73, in the tournament quarterfinals. Asahisa won the fight by unanimous decision. Two months later, Asahisa fought Leona Pettas in the tournament semifinals, and lost by a dominant unanimous decision (30-27, 29-27, 29-27). Asahisa suffered the first knockdown of his professional career in the first round of the fight.

Chinese circuit
After a loss to Wang Wanben at Wu Lin Feng 2017 World Championship Xi'an, Asahisa returned to K-1 to fight the one-time Krush Featherweight title challenger Tatsuya Oiwa at Krush 82. Asahisa won the fight by unanimous decision, managing to knock down Oiwa in the first round. Asahisa was next scheduled to fight Shue Shenzheng at the Wu Lin Feng 2018: -60kg World Championship Tournament, in a reserve bout of a WLF 60kg bout. He won the fight by decision. Asahisa extended his winning streak to three with a dominant unanimous decision victory over Satomi Yuzuki at Krush 91.

Asahisa was scheduled to make his return to K-1 at K-1 World GP 2018: K-1 Lightweight World Tournament, being scheduled to fight the former Krush Featherweight champion Riku Anpo. After a slow start in the first round, Asahisa began to build momentum from the second round onwards, managing to knock Anpo down in the dying seconds of the last round. Asahisa would win the fight by a unanimous decision, with two of the three judges scoring the bout 30-26 in his favor.

Second Krush Super Featherweight tournament
Asahisa once again took part in a Krush Super Featherweight tournament, with the quarterfinal bout being held at Krush 98. He was scheduled to fight a rematch with the Leona Pettas. Although the fight was closer than their first meeting, Pettas nonetheless won the bout by unanimous decision, eliminating Asahisa in the first round of the tournament.

Asahisa rebounded from his second loss to Pettas with a unanimous decision victory against Naoki Yamamoto at Krush 101. He was afterwards scheduled to fight Tomoya Yokoyama at Krush 104. Asahisa had a slow start to the fight, with all three judges scoring the first round as a draw. Asahisa built momentum as the fight went on, winning the bout by unanimous decision. Asahisa's last fight at 60kg was against Narufumi Nishimoto at Krush 107. He won the fight by a second-round knockout, dropping Nishimoto with a left body kick in the last minute of the second round.

Lightweight career

Asahisa vs. Hayashi
Asahisa stepped in on a four days notice to fight the reigning K-1 Lightweight champion Kenta Hayashi at K-1 World GP 2020: K’Festa 3. Hayashi was originally scheduled to fight Shuai Zhu, before the fight was cancelled due to the COVID-19 pandemic. The replacement opponent, Kim Falk, was likewise later removed from the card and replaced by Asahisa for the same reason. Asahisa weighed in 2.2kg lighter than his opponent and came into the fight as a significant underdog. Hayashi was at the time considered to be the best kickboxer under 65kg. During the first round of the bout, Asahisa fought on the outside and attempted to keep distance from the advancing Hayashi. 41 seconds into the second round, however, Asahisa landed a jumping switch kick which resulted in a knockdown. Asahisa pressured after the fight resumed, scoring a second knockdown at the 1:44 minute mark of the second round. Although he failed to score the third knockdown, Asahisa was in control of the remainder of the fight, winning the unanimous decision by a wide margin. Two of the three judges scored the fight 30-26 in his favor, while the third judge scored the fight 29-26 in his favor. His victory over the world's best lightweight at the time was considered a massive upset. During the press conference, Asahisa stated he would move up to lightweight permanently, and further expressed his desire to fight for the K-1 Lightweight title.

Hiroki and Hasumi bouts
Asahisa was scheduled to fight Hiroki at K-1 World GP 2020 in Osaka, in his second fight at lightweight. Asahisa defeated Hiroki by second round high kick knockout, having been knocked down in the first round. Combat Press would later awarded Asahisa "Knockout of the Year" honors for this knockout. Asahisa was scheduled to fight Hikaru Hasumi at K-1 World GP 2020 Winter's Crucial Bout. During the third round, Asahisa injured Hasumi's knee with an inside leg kick. This was quickly followed by a knee to Hasumi's body, which resulted in a knockdown. Despite Hasumi standing up in time for the eight-count, the referee decided to stop the fight.

K-1 Lightweight champion
Asahisa was scheduled to fight the reigning K-1 Lightweight champion Gonnapar Weerasakreck at K-1 World GP 2021 in Fukuoka. Asahisa had previously beat Kenta Hayashi, then the K-1 Lightweight champion, in a non-title bout, while Gonnapar became the champion after dethroning Hayashi at K-1 World GP 2020 Winter's Crucial Bout. At the time of the bout's scheduling, Asahisa and Gonnapar were considered the #1 and #2 ranked fighters under 64kg. Following a closely contested three rounds, the fight was declared a majority draw. Two of the judges scored it an even 29-29, while the third judge scored it 29-28 in favor of Asahisa. Accordingly, an extra round was fought, after which Asahisa was awarded a split decision.

Asahisa faced Yuki Yoza in a non-title bout at K-1 World GP 2022 Japan on February 27, 2022. The fight was ruled a draw after the first three rounds, with two judges scoring the bout an even 30–30 draw, while the third judge scored the bout 30–28 in favor of Yoza. An extension round was therefore contested, after which Yoza was awarded the unanimous decision victory.

Asahisa made his first K-1 Lightweight title defense against Yuki Yoza at K-1 World GP 2023: K'Festa 6 on March 12, 2023, in what was an immediate rematch of his upset loss to Yoza the previous year. He lost the fight by unanimous decision, with two scorecards of 30–29 and one scorecard of 30–28. During a post-fight interview, Asahisa revealed he had suffered a right hand fracture before the bout took place, which was exacerbated in the second round.

Titles and accomplishments

K-1
 2021 K-1 World GP Japan Lightweight Champion
J-NETWORK
2014 J-Network Next Generation Cup -55kg Winner

Awards
 2020 Combat Press Knockout of the Year
 July 2021 eFight.com Fighter of the Month
 2021 K-1 Outstanding Performance Award

Kickboxing record

|- style="background:#fbb"
| 2023-03-12 || Loss ||align=left| Yuki Yoza || K-1 World GP 2023: K'Festa 6 || Tokyo, Japan || Decision (Unanimous) || 3 || 3:00 
|-
! style=background:white colspan=9 |
|-
|- style="background:#fbb"
| 2022-02-27|| Loss||align=left| Yuki Yoza ||  K-1 World GP 2022 Japan || Tokyo, Japan || Ext.R Decision (Unanimous)  || 4 ||3:00  

|-  style="text-align:center; background:#cfc;"
| 2021-07-17 || Win || align=left| Kongnapa Weerasakreck ||  K-1 World GP 2021 in Fukuoka || Fukuoka, Japan || Ext.R Decision (Split)|| 4||3:00  
|-
! style=background:white colspan=9 |
|-  style="text-align:center; background:#cfc;"
| 2020-12-13|| Win || align=left| Hikaru Hasumi || K-1 World GP 2020 Winter's Crucial Bout|| Tokyo, Japan || KO (Knee to the body) || 3 ||1:48
|-  style="text-align:center; background:#cfc;"
| 2020-09-22|| Win || align=left| Hiroki || K-1 World GP 2020 in Osaka|| Osaka, Japan || KO (Left High kick) || 2||0:56
|-  style="text-align:center; background:#cfc;"
| 2020-03-22|| Win ||align=left| Kenta Hayashi || K-1 World GP 2020: K’Festa 3 || Saitama, Japan || Decision (Unanimous)||3 ||3:00
|-  style="text-align:center; background:#CCFFCC;"
| 2019-11-08|| Win ||align=left| Narufumi Nishimoto || Krush 107 || Tokyo, Japan || KO (Left Body Kick) || 2 || 2:21
|-  style="text-align:center; background:#CCFFCC;"
| 2019-08-31|| Win ||align=left| Tomoya Yokoyama || Krush 104 || Tokyo, Japan || Decision (Unanimous) || 3 || 3:00
|-  style="text-align:center; background:#CCFFCC;"
| 2019-05-18|| Win ||align=left| Naoki Yamamoto || Krush.101 || Tokyo, Japan || Decision (Unanimous) ||3  ||3:00
|-  style="text-align:center; background:#FFBBBB;"
| 2019-02-16|| Loss||align=left| Leona Pettas || Krush.98, Super Featherweight Championship Tournament Quarter Final || Tokyo, Japan || Decision (Unanimous)|| 3 || 3:00
|-style="text-align:center; background:#CCFFCC;"
| 2018-12-08|| Win || align=left| Riku Anpo || K-1 World GP 2018: K-1 Lightweight World's Best Tournament || Osaka, Japan ||  Decision (Unanimous)|| 3 || 3:00
|-  style="text-align:center; background:#CCFFCC;"
| 2018-08-05|| Win ||align=left| Satomi Yuzuki || Krush.91 || Tokyo, Japan || Decision (Unanimous)|| 3 || 3:00
|-  style="text-align:center; background:#CCFFCC;"
| 2018-03-10|| Win ||align=left| Shue Shenzheng || Wu Lin Feng 2018: -60kg World Championship Tournament|| Jiaozuo, China || Decision (Unanimous)|| 3 || 3:00
|-  style="text-align:center; background:#CCFFCC;"
| 2017-11-05|| Win ||align=left| Tatsuya Oiwa || Krush.82 || Tokyo, Japan || Decision (Unanimous)|| 3 || 3:00
|-  style="text-align:center; background:#FFBBBB;"
| 2017-09-02|| Loss||align=left| Wang Wanben || Wu Lin Feng 2017 World Championship Xi'an || Jiaozuo, China || Decision || 3 || 3:00
|-  style="text-align:center; background:#FFBBBB;"
| 2017-04-02|| Loss||align=left| Leona Pettas || Krush.75, Tournament Semifinal || Tokyo, Japan || Decision (Unanimous)|| 3 || 3:00
|-  style="text-align:center; background:#CCFFCC;"
| 2017-02-18|| Win ||align=left| Sano Tenma || Krush.73, Tournament Quarterfinal || Tokyo, Japan || Decision (Unanimous)|| 3 || 3:00
|-  style="text-align:center; background:#CCFFCC;"
| 2016-10-15|| Win ||align=left| Fumiya Osawa || Krush.70 || Tokyo, Japan || Decision (Majority)|| 3 || 3:00
|-  style="text-align:center; background:#FFBBBB;"
| 2016-06-24|| Loss||align=left| Haruma Saikyo || K-1 World GP 2016 -65kg World Tournament || Tokyo, Japan || Decision (Majority)|| 3 || 3:00
|-  style="text-align:center; background:#FFBBBB;"
| 2016-03-26|| Loss||align=left| Kim Sang-Jae || MAX FC || Seoul, South Korea || Decision || 3 || 3:00
|-  style="text-align:center; background:#CCFFCC;"
| 2015-11-07|| Win ||align=left| Chibita || Pound for Pound vol.5 || Kyushu, Japan || Decision || 3 || 3:00
|-  style="text-align:center; background:#FFBBBB;"
| 2015-10-04|| Loss||align=left| Keisuke Ishida || Krush.59 || Tokyo, Japan || Decision (Unanimous)|| 3 || 3:00
|-  style="text-align:center; background:#CCFFCC;"
| 2015-05-04|| Win ||align=left| Chikara Iwao || Krush.54 || Tokyo, Japan || Decision (Majority) || 3 || 3:00
|-  style="text-align:center; background:#fbb;"
| 2015-01-04|| Loss ||align=left| Namito Izawa || Krush.49 || Tokyo, Japan || Ext.R Decision (Unanimous) || 4 || 3:00
|-  style="text-align:center; background:#CCFFCC;"
| 2014-09-21|| Win ||align=left| Teru ||J-FIGHT in Shinjuku vol.39 - Next Generation Cup, Final || Tokyo, Japan || Decision (Unanimous)|| 2 || 3:00
|-
! style=background:white colspan=9 |
|-  style="text-align:center; background:#CCFFCC;"
| 2014-09-21|| Win ||align=left| Takaya Ogura ||J-FIGHT in Shinjuku vol.39 - Next Generation Cup, Semi Final || Tokyo, Japan || TKO || 2 || 0:09
|-  style="text-align:center; background:#CCFFCC;"
| 2014-09-21|| Win ||align=left| Masachika Morimoto ||J-FIGHT in Shinjuku vol.39 - Next Generation Cup, Quarter Final || Tokyo, Japan || Decision (Unanimous)|| 2 || 3:00
|-
| colspan=9 | Legend:    

|-  style="background:#FFBBBB;"
| 2014-07-21|| Loss || align=left| Ren Hiramoto || K-1 Koshien 2014 Tournament, First Round || Tokyo, Japan || Decision || 1 ||2:00
|-  style="background:#CCFFCC;"
| 2013-12|| Win ||align=left| Yushi || Pound for Pound Vol.3 || Kyushu, Japan || Decision || 2 ||3:00
|-  style="background:#CCFFCC;"
| 2013-07-20|| Win ||align=left| Ikki Muramatsu || Pound for Pound Vol.2 || Kyushu, Japan || Decision || 2 ||3:00
|- style="background:#FFBBBB;"
| 2013-03-31|| Loss || align="left" | Tenshin Nasukawa || 2013 All Japan Jr. Kick Tournament, Semi Final ||Tokyo, Japan|| Decision || 2 || 2:00
|- style="background:#CCFFCC;"
| 2013-03-31|| Win || align="left" |  || 2013 All Japan Jr. Kick Tournament, Quarter Final ||Tokyo, Japan|| Decision || 2 || 2:00
|-  style="background:#CCFFCC;"
| 2012-09-30|| Win ||align=left| Naruse Kodama || M-1 Kyushu || Kyushu, Japan || TKO || 1 ||1:18
|- style="background:#FFBBBB;"
| 2012-04-15|| Loss || align="left" | Tenshin Nasukawa || 2012 All Japan Jr. Kick  Tournament, Quarter Final ||Tokyo, Japan||Decision || 2 || 2:00
|-  style="background:#CCFFCC;"
| 2012-03-04|| Win ||align=left| Takaaki Yamamoto || 2012 All Japan Jr. Kick Kyushu Selection Tournament, Final || Kyushu, Japan || Decision|| 2 || 2:00
|-  style="background:#CCFFCC;"
| 2011-10-15|| Win ||align=left|  || GP || Kyushu, Japan || KO ||  ||
|-  style="background:#CCFFCC;"
| 2011-09-17|| Win ||align=left|  || GP || Kyushu, Japan || KO || 1 || 1:58
|-  style="background:#FFBBBB;"
| 2011-06-19|| Loss ||align=left| Katsuki Nogami ||M-1 Muay Thai Amateur Kyushu, Final || Kyushu, Japan || Decision || 2 || 2:00
|-  style="background:#CCFFCC;"
| 2011-06-19|| Win ||align=left| Hino Nakagawa ||M-1 Muay Thai Amateur Kyushu, Semi Final || Kyushu, Japan || Decision || 2 || 2:00
|-  style="background:#FFBBBB;"
| 2011-01-10|| Loss ||align=left| Naruse Kodama ||M-1 Muay Thai Amateur Kyushu || Kyushu, Japan || Decision || 2 || 2:00
|-
| colspan=9 | Legend:

See also
 List of male kickboxers
 List of K-1 champions

References

1998 births

Bantamweight kickboxers

Living people
Japanese male kickboxers
Sportspeople from Fukuoka Prefecture
People from Ukiha, Fukuoka